Serge Proulx (born 8 July 1953) is a Canadian former cyclist. He competed in the team time trial event at the 1976 Summer Olympics.

References

External links
 

1953 births
Living people
Canadian male cyclists
Olympic cyclists of Canada
Cyclists at the 1976 Summer Olympics
Cyclists from Quebec City